The Malta national futsal team represents Malta in international futsal competitions, such as the FIFA Futsal World Cup and the European Championships, and is controlled by the Malta Football Association.

Competition history

FIFA Futsal World Cup

UEFA Futsal Championship

Current squad 

The following players were named for the matches against Northern Ireland to be played on 26 and 27 October 2018.

References

External links 
 Official site of the Malta Football Association
 Futsal Malta Association

Malta
futsal
Futsal in Malta